Josef Scheiber is an Austrian cross-country skier. He represented Austria at the 1976 Winter Paralympics and at the 1980 Winter Paralympics. He won the bronze medal in the Men's 3x10 km Relay III-IV B event at the 1976 Winter Paralympics and the silver medal in the Men's 4x5 km Relay 3A-3B event at the 1980 Winter Paralympics.

References 

Living people
Year of birth missing (living people)
Place of birth missing (living people)
Cross-country skiers at the 1976 Winter Paralympics
Cross-country skiers at the 1980 Winter Paralympics
Medalists at the 1976 Winter Paralympics
Medalists at the 1980 Winter Paralympics
Paralympic silver medalists for Austria
Paralympic bronze medalists for Austria
Paralympic medalists in cross-country skiing
Paralympic cross-country skiers of Austria
20th-century Austrian people